Carolina Cruz Osorio is a Colombian journalist, presenter, model, and businesswoman.

Early life and career
She lived her childhood and adolescence in Cali. She was a cheerleader and fan of the América de Cali soccer team during adolescence, this being her first job. In 1999, she participated in Miss Colombia, representing Valle del Cauca where she ranked second, being the winner of the title of Miss Colombia International or Viceroy National. The winner of the pageant was Miss Cundinamarca, Catalina Acosta, and the following year she represented Colombia in Miss International.

After the contest, she continued with modeling and reporting jobs at El Noticiero del Espectáculo, for the Jorge Barón Television programmer. In 2000, she was linked to Canal RCN as host of the show Comandos together with Iván Lalinde and led the presentation of the entertainment slot of Noticias RCN, together with Andrea Serna. Shortly after, she joined the cast of Muy buenos días, along with Jota Mario Valencia and Yaneth Waldman. After five years, and after participating in the reality show Dancing for a dream, which she won, she decided not to return to presenting the magazine. In 2007, she hosted the third season of the reality show Extreme Change.

Later, she created her own company, Carolina Cruz Empresa Unipersonal and Carolina Cruz Jewelry and Accessories. There she has hired women from the Vida Nueva Foundation. In 2012 she joined the Oriflame company, a catalog sales brand around the world, to distribute her brand abroad.

In the following years, he was presenting several programs, among which Planeta Gente from NTN24, Justo a tiempo and Cita a ciegas from RCN Televisión stand out. After thirteen years in that channel, she resigned and joined Canal Caracol, where she participated as a presenter in the broadcasts of Miss Universe and Colombia's Next Top Model. Currently, she is happy with her son Matías and her husband Lincoln with whom she lives in a free union.

In August 2018, she joined the morning program Día a día on Caracol Televisión as a presenter. Her best friend is Paola Calle, she belongs to the petit committee formed by Andrea Serna, Yaneth Waldman, Jéssica de la Peña, Ángela Cardozo.

Filmography

Presenter

Awards and nominations

India Catalina Awards

References

Living people
Colombian women television journalists
Colombian television journalists
Colombian women television presenters
Colombian television presenters
People from Valle del Cauca Department
1979 births